Kathryn Evans (born 5 August 1981) is an English former competitive swimmer who represented Great Britain in the Olympic Games.  Evans specialised in freestyle and individual medley events.  She is a two-time Olympian (2000 and 2004), and a double British champion in the 200 m individual medley (2001 and 2002).  Evans also played for Nova Centurion Swim Club in Nottingham, under head coach Bill Furniss. Evans is the cousin of late rower Acer Nethercott, who competed in the men's eight at the 2008 Summer Olympics in Beijing.

Evans made her Olympic debut, as a member of Team GB, at the 2000 Summer Olympics in Sydney, where she competed in the 200 m individual medley. Swimming in heat five, she rounded out a field of eight swimmers to last place and twenty-fourth overall in 2:19.41, just 5.58 seconds behind defending Olympic champion Yana Klochkova of Ukraine.

At the 2004 Summer Olympics in Athens, Evans competed only in two events as a relay swimmer. She finished second in the 100 m freestyle from the Olympic trials in Sheffield, posting a relay entry time of 55.52. On the first day of the Games, Evans helped out the Brits to pull off a sixth-place effort in the 4 × 100 m freestyle relay with a final time of 3:40.82. Teaming with Melanie Marshall, Karen Pickering, and Lisa Chapman in the final, Evans swam a second leg, and posted a lifetime best of 54.33. Exactly a week later, in the 4 × 100 m medley relay, Evans, along with Katy Sexton, Kirsty Balfour, and Georgina Lee, finished in fifth place, but were later disqualified due to an early take-off in the anchor freestyle leg.

References

External links
Profile – British Amateur Swimming Federation

1981 births
Living people
English female swimmers
English female freestyle swimmers
Female medley swimmers
Olympic swimmers of Great Britain
Sportspeople from Luton
Swimmers at the 2000 Summer Olympics
Swimmers at the 2002 Commonwealth Games
Swimmers at the 2004 Summer Olympics
Commonwealth Games competitors for Scotland
Scottish female swimmers
20th-century English women
21st-century English women